Saxifraga granulata, commonly called meadow saxifrage, is a species of flowering plant in the family Saxifragaceae. It is native to Europe and Morocco.

Taxonomy
Saxifraga granulata was first formally described by Linnaeus as part of his original description of Saxifraga in Species Plantarum in 1753. S. granulata is the type species of the genus Saxifraga.

References

granulata
Flora of Scotland
Plants described in 1753
Taxa named by Carl Linnaeus